Tygem is an internet go server owned by South Korean company TongYang Online. Popular in Asia, their website states that over 500  professional Go players use their service.

Tygem was founded as ICBL by Cho Hun-hyun in 2000, and renamed to Tygem in 2001, invested by Tongyang Group and JoongAng Ilbo.

In October 2015, AlphaGo from DeepMind beat the European Go champion Fan Hui five to zero. Eight million positions from human games on the Tygem server were used to train AlphaGo.

References

External links 
 Tygem (main Korean site)
 Tygem Go (English site)

Go servers